Shamsabad (also Romanized as Shamsābād; also known as Boneh-ye Qarẕ ‘Alī) is a village in Jahangiri Rural District, in the Central District of Masjed Soleyman County, Khuzestan Province, Iran. According to the 2006 census, its population numbered at 11, in 4 families.

References 

Populated places in Masjed Soleyman County